The 1999–2000 Honduran Segunda División was the 33rd season of the Honduran Segunda División.  Under the management of Juan Ramos, Deportes Savio won the tournament after defeating Palestino F.C. in the final series and obtained promotion to the 2000–01 Honduran Liga Nacional.

Final

References

Segunda
1999